Adhi, also spelt as Ahdi, (Urdu:آھدى) is a village and  Union Council in Gujar Khan Tehsil, in the Rawalpindi District of Punjab, Pakistan. Official Website: digitalAdhi.com

Populated places in Rawalpindi District